This is a list of the first minority male lawyer(s) and judge(s) in Oklahoma. It includes the year in which the men were admitted to practice law (in parentheses). Also included are men who achieved other distinctions such becoming the first in their state to graduate from law school or become a political figure.

Firsts in state history

Lawyers 

 First known African American/Creek Freedmen male to practice: Sugar T. George (c. 1870s)  
First Cherokee Indian male: Simon R. Walking-Stick (c. 1893)  
First African American male (admitted to state bar): Buck Colbert (B.C.) Franklin (1908)  
First undocumented male: Javier Hernandez in 2019

State judges 

 First African American male: Charles L. Owens (1960) in 1968 
 First African American male (elected): Amos T. Hall in 1970 
 First African American male: David Lewis in 2004 (2004) 
 First African American male (Supreme Court of Oklahoma): Tom Colbert (1982) in 2004 
 First African American male (Presiding Judge; Oklahoma Court of Criminal Appeals): David Lewis 
 First African American male (Chief Justice; Supreme Court of Oklahoma): Tom Colbert (1982) in 2013 
 First Native American (Chickasaw Nation) male (Supreme Court of Oklahoma): Dustin Rowe in 2019

Federal judges 
First Native American male (Cherokee Nation) (United States District Court for the Eastern District of Oklahoma): Frank Howell Seay in 1979 
First Native American (Choctaw Nation of Oklahoma) male (U.S. District Court for the Eastern District of Oklahoma, Northern District of Oklahoma, and Western District of Oklahoma): Michael Burrage (1974) beginning 1994 
First African American male (U.S. Court of Appeals for the Tenth Circuit): Jerome Holmes (1988) in 2006 
First African American male (United States District Court for the Western District of Oklahoma): Bernard M. Jones in 2019

Assistant Attorney General 

 First African American male: Charles L. Owens (1960) in 1963

Political Office 

First African American male (Oklahoma State Senate): E. Melvin Porter (1960) in 1964

Firsts in local history 

 David Lewis: First African American male to serve as a district judge in Comanche County, Oklahoma (1999)
 Steve Pazzo: First Hispanic American male judge in Rogers County, Oklahoma (2010)
 Carlos Chappelle: First African American male to serve as a Presiding District Judge in Tulsa County, Oklahoma (2013)

See also 

 List of first minority male lawyers and judges in the United States

Other topics of interest 

 List of first women lawyers and judges in the United States
 List of first women lawyers and judges in Oklahoma

References 

 
Minority, Oklahoma, first
Minority, Oklahoma, first
Legal history of Oklahoma
Lists of people from Oklahoma
Oklahoma lawyers